Nell Stevens (born 1985) is a British writer of memoirs and fiction. She is an assistant professor in the University of Warwick School of Creative Arts, Performance and Visual Cultures, where she teaches on the Warwick Writing Programme and lists her research interests as "historical fiction, autofiction, life writing, hybrid forms".

Writing
Stevens has published two memoirs.  Bleaker House (2017) is about a period living on Bleaker Island in the South Atlantic.)  Mrs Gaskell and Me (2018) draws on her own life and that of the English novelist Elizabeth Gaskell (1810-1865). Her first novel Briefly, a Delicious Life was published in 2022. She was shortlisted for the 2018 BBC National Short Story Award, and has written for publications including The New York Times, Vogue, The Paris Review, The New York Review of Books, The Guardian and Granta.

She won a 2019 Somerset Maugham Award for Mrs Gaskell and Me.

Stevens appeared on BBC Radio 4's Open Book in January 2023, where she and Tom Crewe "discuss[ed] drawing creatively on marginal - and radical - LGBTQ voices from the 19th century".

Personal life
Stevens lives in London with her wife and son.

Selected publications
 
 (Published in United States as The Victorian and the romantic: a memoir, a love story, and a friendship across time)

References

External links

1985 births
Living people
Academics of the University of Warwick
21st-century British novelists
21st-century British non-fiction writers
21st-century British women writers
British LGBT writers